Upper Ganges Canal Expressway, also known as Hindon Expressway, is a planned eight-lane  expressway. It is planned to stretch from Bulandshahr, Uttar Pradesh to Haridwar, Uttarakhand through Muzaffarnagar and Roorkee, in India.

References

Transport in Haridwar
Transport in Ghaziabad, Uttar Pradesh